Dronten is a Dutch railway station, on the Lelystad–Zwolle railway, also knowns as the Hanzelijn. The station is located in the north of Dronten.

The station is located on a viaduct station at 7 m above street level.

Train services

The station is served by the following service(s):

Local Sprinter services The Hague - Schiphol Airport - Amsterdam - Weesp - Almere - Lelystad - Zwolle

Bus services
 21: town service
 22: town service
 143: Dronten to Kampen and Genemuiden
 145: Dronten to Swifterbant and Lelystad
 147: Dronten to Biddinghuizen and Harderwijk

External links
NS website
Dutch Public Transport journey planner

Railway stations on the Hanzelijn
Railway stations in Flevoland
Railway stations opened in 2012
Dronten